Timothy Donahue Kelly (August 15, 1944 – August 17, 2009) was an American businessman and politician.

Born in Sacramento, California, Kelly graduated from Sacramento High School in 1962. He served in the United States Marine Corps and later in the Alaska Air National Guard. He was a legislative aide in California and Nevada. In 1970, he moved to Alaska and settled in Anchorage, Alaska. He was in the banking business and was a Republican. Kelly served in the Alaska House of Representatives from 1977 to 1979 and then served in the Alaska State Senate from 1979 to 2001. In 1989 and 1990, Kelly served as the senate president. Kelly died at his home, in Anchorage, Alaska, from heart problems.

Notes

External links

1944 births
2009 deaths
Politicians from Anchorage, Alaska
Politicians from Sacramento, California
Military personnel from California
Businesspeople from Anchorage, Alaska
Presidents of the Alaska Senate
Republican Party Alaska state senators
Republican Party members of the Alaska House of Representatives
Military personnel from Anchorage, Alaska
20th-century American politicians
20th-century American businesspeople